Mike Sanford may refer to:

Mike Sanford Sr. (born 1955), American football coach
Mike Sanford Jr. (born 1982), American football coach